It Rained All Night the Day I Left is a comedy film made in 1978 but not theatrically released until 1980. Directed by Nicolas Gessner, the film was a co-production of film studios from Canada, France and Israel.

The film stars Tony Curtis and Louis Gossett Jr. as two gun-runners making a trip through the desert to transport guns for The Colonel (Sally Kellerman). The film's cast also includes John Vernon and Lisa Langlois.

The film was released theatrically in Europe, both in its original English and in a dubbed French version titled Deux affreux sur le sable. It received no theatrical release in North America, instead it was premiered as a television film on CTV and The Movie Channel on August 23, 1982.

Gossett's role had originally been slated to be performed by Billy Dee Williams.

Kellerman later dismissed her performance in the film, telling the press that "I always say that I was solidly mediocre and everybody else stunk."

Awards and nominations
The film garnered four Genie Award nominations at the 1st Genie Awards in 1980:
Best Foreign Actress: Sally Kellerman
Best Adapted Screenplay: Ted Allan
Best Art Direction/Production Design: Wolf Kroeger
Best Original Score: Alain Leroux
It did not win any of the awards.

References

External links
 

1980 films
1980s crime comedy films
Canadian crime comedy films
1980s English-language films
Films directed by Nicolas Gessner
Quebec films
English-language Canadian films
English-language French films
English-language Israeli films
French crime comedy films
Israeli crime comedy films
1980 comedy films
1980s Canadian films
1980s French films